Upper and Lower Black Moss Reservoirs are reservoirs close to the village of Barley, in the Borough of Pendle, close to the market town of Burnley, England. The reservoirs provide drinking water to Nelson when needed.

Ornithology 

During the winter different species of wildfowl can be seen. These include:
 Mallard (Anas platyrhynchos)
 Tufted duck (Aythya fuligula)
 Common goldeneye (Bucephala clangula)
 Goosander (Mergus merganser)
 Common pochard (Aythya ferina)
 Common teal (Anas crecca).

During the summer the number of ducks declines. These are largely replaced by wading birds such as:
 Northern lapwing (Vanellus vanellus)
 Eurasian curlew (Numenius arquata)
 Common redshank (Tringa totanus)

Other birds seen at the reservoir include:
 Linnet (Carduelis cannabina)
 Common stonechat (Saxicola torquatus)
 Skylark (Alauda arvensis)
 Common sandpiper (Actitis hypoleucos)
 Reed bunting (Emberiza schoeniclus)

References 

Drinking water reservoirs in England
Reservoirs in Lancashire
Geography of the Borough of Pendle